Won-Gil Son (born 1 January 1999) is a South Korean footballer.

External links
 

South Korean footballers
Kapfenberger SV players
1999 births
Living people
Association football midfielders